The White Ribbon Campaign (WRC) is a global movement of men and boys working to end male violence against women and girls. It was formed by a group of pro-feminist men in London, Ontario, in November 1991 as a response to the École Polytechnique massacre of female students by Marc Lépine in 1989. The campaign was intended to raise awareness about the prevalence of male violence against women, with the ribbon symbolizing "the idea of men giving up their arms". Active in over 60 countries, the movement seeks to promote healthy relationships, gender equity, and a compassionate vision of masculinity.

History

The historical context of this day was an instance of misogyny which occurred at the École Polytechnique in Montreal, Quebec, Canada on 6 December 1989 and referred to as the Montreal Massacre. The massacre resulted when twenty-five-year-old Marc Lépine slaughtered 14 women because of his hatred toward women. Much of their work centres around gender violence prevention which includes educating and mentoring young men about issues such as violence and gender equality. Men and boys are encouraged to wear white ribbons as a symbol of their opposition to violence against women. They are particularly encouraged to wear these during White Ribbon week which starts on November the 25th which is the UN Day for the Elimination of Violence Against Women.

The White Ribbon Campaign is active in over 60 nations across the world including Canada, UK, Pakistan, Italy and Australia.

In 2018 for Australia, the day was moved from 25 November to 23 November to become a specific campaign day separate to the international day, and expanded to encompass violence against children. Businesses are able to attain a "white ribbon accredited workplace", valid for three years.

On 3 October 2019, the Australian arm of the movement, White Ribbon Australia, was placed into liquidation after posting a net loss of AU$840,000 in its financial reports.  By March 2020 a Western Australia-based community service organisation bought White Ribbon Australia, with the White Ribbon Canada Executive Director welcoming their commitment to collaborating to 'challenge and support men and boys to realise their potential to be part of the solution in ending all forms of gender-based violence'.  The new Australian CEO in June 2020 stated an intent to focus more on domestic violence, and move away from being a specific campaign engaging males, to 'involve all Australians'.

Whiteribbon.org

In 2014  the men's rights activist organisation A Voice for Men launched whiteribbon.org as a counter to the White Ribbon campaign, adopting graphics and language from White Ribbon. It is owned by Erin Pizzey and has the slogan "Stop Violence Against Everyone". Accused of "hijacking" White Ribbon, the site was harshly criticized by Todd Minerson, the former executive director of The White Ribbon Campaign, who described it as "a copycat campaign articulating their archaic views and denials about the realities of gender-based violence". The site presents the claim that domestic violence is a learned behaviour from childhood, perpetrated equally by women and men. The website has faced much criticism, being accused of displaying "anti-feminist propaganda".

Criticism 
Although the WRC was meant to be a men's peer pressure campaign, the activities of the Australian organisation came into question in 2016 and after, with allegations that the day was mostly organised by women, and was an example of slacktivism, rather than an effective means of effecting useful change. It was also alleged that much of the funding raised was being absorbed by administrative costs.  The organisation denied the criticisms, with supporters such as White Ribbon ambassador, Matt de Groot, challenging the claims.  Research argued White Ribbon Australia's "failure to articulate the meaning of, both, gender equality and respect is a crucial lack".

In October 2018, White Ribbon Australia made plans to retract its position statement that women "should have complete control over their reproductive and sexual health", moving to an "agnostic" stance to consult with community stakeholders. Following criticism of the move, the original position statement was reinstated several hours later. The change in position occurred on the same morning the Parliament of Queensland voted to decriminalise abortion, which came after a lengthy process involving the Queensland Law Reform Commission (QLRC). White Ribbon Australia was referred to in the QLRC's Review of Termination of Pregnancy Laws Report, for its submission supporting the need for "nationally consistent access to safe and legal abortion".

References

External links

Official website
White Ribbon Australia
UK website
White Ribbon Austria

Domestic violence-related organizations
Men's organizations
Organizations established in 1991
1991 establishments in Ontario
Awareness ribbon